Wong Meng Kong (born 18 September 1963) is a chess player from Singapore. He won the Singaporean Chess Championship in 1986, 1989, 1990 and 1991. He represented Singapore at the Chess Olympiad eleven times (1982, 1984, 1986, 1988, 1990, 1992, 1996, 2000, 2002, 2004, 2006).

Wong won the 1979 Asian Junior Chess Championship in Sivakasi. In 1999, he was awarded the title of Grandmaster by FIDE, becoming the first Singaporean to achieve this feat.

Wong did his 'O'-Levels at Anglo-Chinese School in 1979 and his 'A'-Levels at Anglo-Chinese Junior College in 1981.  He went on to get his medical degree from National University of Singapore in 1987.  He currently resides in Hong Kong with his family where he practises psychiatric medicine.

References

External links

Meng Kong Wong chess games at 365Chess.com

1963 births
Living people
Chess grandmasters
Singaporean chess players
Chess Olympiad competitors
Singaporean sportspeople of Chinese descent
Anglo-Chinese School alumni
Anglo-Chinese Junior College alumni
National University of Singapore alumni
Place of birth missing (living people)
Southeast Asian Games bronze medalists for Singapore
Southeast Asian Games medalists in chess
Competitors at the 2005 Southeast Asian Games
20th-century Singaporean people